On Monday, August 29, 2005, there were over 50 failures of the levees and flood walls protecting New Orleans, Louisiana, and its suburbs following passage of Hurricane Katrina. The failures caused flooding in 80% of New Orleans and all of St. Bernard Parish. In New Orleans alone, 134,000 housing units — 70% of all occupied units — suffered damage from Hurricane Katrina and the subsequent flooding.

When Katrina's storm surge arrived, the hurricane protection system was between 60–90% complete. Responsibility for the design and construction of the levee system belongs to the United States Army Corps of Engineers, while responsibility for maintenance belongs to the local levee districts. Six major investigations were conducted by civil engineers and other experts in an attempt to identify the underlying reasons for the failure of the federal flood protection system. All concurred that the primary cause of the flooding was inadequate design and construction by the Army Corps of Engineers. In April 2007, the American Society of Civil Engineers termed the flooding of New Orleans as "the worst engineering catastrophe in US History."

There were six major breaches in the city of New Orleans itself (the Orleans parish, as compared to Greater New Orleans which comprises eight parishes):

Three major breaches occurred on the Inner Harbor Navigation Canal (locally known as the Industrial Canal). A breach on the northeast side near the junction with the Gulf Intracoastal Waterway flooded New Orleans East. Two breaches on the southeast side between Florida Avenue and Claiborne Avenue combined into a single 1,000 foot wide hole  that allowed stormwater to catastrophically rush into the adjacent Lower Ninth Ward.
On the western edge of New Orleans near Hammond Highway, a breach opened in the 17th Street Canal levee. Floodwater flowed through a hole that became 450 feet wide, flooding the adjacent Lakeview neighborhood.
The London Avenue Canal in the Gentilly region, breached on both sides; on the west side near Robert E. Lee Boulevard and on the east near Mirabeau Avenue. 

Storm surge caused breaches in 20 places on the Mississippi River-Gulf Outlet Canal ("MR-GO") in Saint Bernard Parish, flooding the entire parish and the East Bank of Plaquemines Parish.

Background

The original residents of New Orleans settled on the high ground along the Mississippi River. Later developments eventually extended to nearby Lake Pontchartrain, built upon fill to bring them above the average lake level. Navigable commercial waterways extended from the lake to downtown. After 1940, the state decided to close those waterways following the completion of a new Industrial Canal for waterborne commerce, which opened in 1923. Closure of the waterways resulted in a drastic lowering of the water table by the city's drainage system, causing some areas to settle by up to 8 feet (2 m) due to the compacting and desiccation of the underlying organic soils.

After the Great Mississippi Flood of 1927, United States Congress passed the Flood Control Act of 1928 which authorized the Corps of Engineers to design and construct flood control structures, along with levees, on the Mississippi River to protect populated areas from floods. It also affirmed the principle of local participation in federally funded projects but acknowledged that the $292 million already spent by local interests was sufficient to cover local participatory costs. It is instructive to note that, in addition, sovereign immunity was given to the Corps of Engineers under Section 3 of the Flood Control Act of 1928, which states “no liability of any kind would attach or rest upon the United States for any damage from or by floods or flood waters at any place, provided that if on any stretch of the banks of the Mississippi River it was impracticable to construct levees.” 33 U.S.C. § 702c. Section 702c is sometimes referred as “Section 3 of the act,” based on where it appears in the Public law.

Heavy flooding caused by Hurricane Betsy in 1965 brought concerns regarding flooding from hurricanes to the forefront. In response, the Congress passed the  Flood Control Act of 1965 which mandated that henceforth, the Corps of Engineers is the agency responsible for design and construction of flood protection projects, to include those in Greater New Orleans. The local interests' role was maintenance once the projects were complete.

Also that year, Congress authorized the Lake Pontchartrain and Vicinity Hurricane Protection Project (LPVHPP) which reiterated the principle of local participation in federally funded projects. The project was initially estimated to take 13 years, but when Katrina struck in 2005, almost 40 years later, the project was only 60–90% complete with a revised projected completion date of 2015.

On August 29, 2005, flood walls and levees catastrophically failed throughout the metro area. Some collapsed well below design thresholds (17th Street and London Canals). Others collapsed after a brief period of overtopping (Industrial Canal) caused scouring or erosion of the earthen levee walls. In April 2007, the American Society of Civil Engineers called the flooding of New Orleans "the worst engineering catastrophe in US History."

Levee and floodwall breaches

There were 28 reported failures in the first 24 hours  and over 50 were reported in the ensuing days. Before dawn on Monday August 29, 2005, waves overtopped and eroded the Mississippi River-Gulf Outlet levees.  At about 5:00 a.m., a 30-foot section of floodwall, called a “monolith,” on the east side of the Inner Harbor Navigation Canal (known locally as the Industrial Canal, breached and released flood water into the adjacent Lower Ninth Ward, a dense lower to middle class neighborhood of primarily black homeowners. By 6:30 a.m. a.m. CDT, levees along the Gulf Intracoastal Waterway, lining the south side of New Orleans East, overtopped and breached.  The surge flooded the primarily middle to upper class Black region.

On the west edge of New Orleans, between 6 and 7:00 a.m., a monolith on the east side of the London Avenue Canal failed and allowed water over 10 feet deep into Fillmore Gardens, a mostly Black middle class neighborhood. At about 6:30 a.m., on the western edge of the city, several monoliths failed on the mighty 17th Street Canal. A torrent of water blasted into Lakeview, a mainly white middle class neighborhood of homeowners. Local fire officials reported the breach. An estimated 66% to 75% of the city was now under water. The Duncan and Bonnabel Pumping Stations were also reported to have suffered roof damage, and were non-functional.

At approximately 7:45 a.m. CDT, a much larger second hole opened up in the Industrial Canal just south of the initial breach. Floodwaters from the two breaches combined to submerge the entire historic Lower Ninth Ward in over 10 feet of water. Between 7 and 8:00 a.m., the west side of the London Avenue Canal breached, in addition to the east side, and flooded the adjacent mixed-race neighborhood of homeowners.

The Orleans Avenue Canal midway between the 17th Street Canal and the London Avenue Canal, engineered to the same standards, and presumably put under similar stress during the hurricane, survived intact due, in part, to the presence of an unintended 100-foot-long ‘spillway,’ a section of legacy wall that was significantly lower than the adjacent floodwalls.

Investigations

Levee investigations
In the ten years following Katrina, over a dozen investigations were conducted. There was no federally ordered independent commission like those ordered after the September 11 terrorist attacks and after the BP Oil Spill in the Gulf. The only federally ordered study was convened and managed by the Army Corps of Engineers, the federal agency responsible for the flood protection's performance.  A major independent study was conducted by the University of California at Berkeley.  A second major study was sponsored by the Louisiana Department of Transportation led by Ivor van Heerden at Louisiana State University. Studies were also done by FEMA, the insurance industry, the National Research Council, the National Institute of Standards and Technology, and the Katrina Consolidated Lawsuit. All studies basically agreed on the engineering mechanisms of failure.

The primary mechanisms of failure at the 17th Street Canal, London Avenue Canal and Industrial Canal (east side north) were improper design of the canal floodwalls. The failure mechanism for the Industrial Canal (east side south and west side) was overtopping of levees and floodwalls by the storm surge. The primary mechanism of failure for levees protecting eastern New Orleans was the existence of sand in 10% of places instead of thick Louisiana clay. The primary mechanism of failure for the levees protecting St. Bernard Parish was overtopping due to negligent maintenance of the Mississippi River Gulf Outlet, a navigation channel, built and maintained by the Corps of Engineers.

A June 2007 report by the American Society of Civil Engineers in peer review panel concluded that the flooding in the Lakeview neighborhood (from the 17th Street Canal) and the Gentilly neighborhood (from the London Avenue Canal) was due to two engineering oversights.

The engineers responsible for the design of the canal levees and the I-walls embedded in them overestimated the soil strength, meaning that the soil strength used in the design calculations was greater than what actually existed under and near the levee during Hurricane Katrina. "The engineers made an unconservative (i.e., erring toward unsafe) interpretation of the data: the soil below the levee was actually weaker than that used in the I-wall design" (ASCE: External Review Panel, pg 48). Another critical engineering oversight that led to the failure of the 17th Street Canal involves not taking into account the possibility of a water-filled gap which turned out to be a very important aspect of the failures of the I-walls around New Orleans. “Analysis indicate that, with the presence of a water-filled gap, the factor of safety is about 30 percent lower. Because a factor of safety of 1.3 was used for design, a reduction of 30 percent would reduce the factor of safety to approximately one: a condition of incipient failure.” (ASCE: External Review Panel, pg 51) This meant that the design included a safety factor of 30% ("1.3"), and could cope in theory with stresses 30% more than expected, but the error due to the water gap was about 30%, which immediately used up the entire safety margin, leaving no leeway in the design if any other excess stress occurred.

Engineers misjudged the strength of the peat which is from the remains of the swamp on which some areas of New Orleans (near Lake Pontchartrain) in the 20th century were built. The shear strength of this peat was found to be very low and it had a high water content. According to Robert Bea, a geotechnical engineer from the University of California, Berkeley, the weak soil made the floodwall very vulnerable to the stresses of a large flood. "At 17th Street, the soil moved laterally, pushing entire wall sections with it. ... As Katrina's storm surge filled the canal, water pressure rose in the soil underneath the wall and in the peat layer. Water moved through the soil underneath the base of the wall. When the rising pressure and moving water overcame the soil's strength, it suddenly shifted, taking surrounding material – and the wall – with it."

The Federal study was initiated in October 2005, by Lt. Gen. Carl Strock, Chief of Engineers and the Commander of the Corps of Engineers; he established the Interagency Performance Evaluation Task Force (IPET) to "provide credible and objective scientific and engineering answers to fundamental questions about the performance of the hurricane protection and flood damage reduction system in the New Orleans metropolitan area.  IPET consisted of independent and recognized experts from the Universities of Maryland, Florida, Notre Dame, and Virginia Polytechnic Institute, the National Oceanic and Atmospheric Administration, the South Florida Water Management District, Harris County Flood Control District (Houston, TX), the United States Department of Agriculture, and the United States Bureau of Reclamation as well as those from USACE.

IPET's final findings indicated that,

Criticism of the IPET Federal Investigation

The IPET's findings are challenged by Levees.org (a grass roots organization) as lacking credibility since the USACE convened and managed the study and also chose and directly compensated its peer review team.  The groups points out that eighty percent of the participants in IPET either worked for the Corps of Engineers or its sister agency Army Research and Development.  The top three leaders all were Corps employees or past employees.

The credibility of the IPET was also challenged in a 42-page letter to the American Society of Civil Engineers (ASCE) submitted by Dr. Ray M. Seed, co-chair of the ILIT study. Dr. Seed described an early intentional plan by the Corps of Engineers to hide their mistakes in the New Orleans flooding after Katrina and to intimidate anyone who tried to intervene. All of this was done with the help and the complicity of some at the ASCE, according to Dr. Seed.

Flood wall design

Investigators focused on the 17th Street and London Avenue canals, where evidence showed they were breached even though water did not flow over their tops, indicating a design or construction flaw. Eyewitness accounts and other evidence show that levees and flood walls in other parts of the city, such as along the Industrial Canal, were topped by floodwaters first, then breached or eroded.

A preliminary report released on November 2, 2005, carried out by independent investigators from the University of California, Berkeley and the American Society of Civil Engineers (ASCE) stated that many New Orleans levee and flood wall failures occurred at weak-link junctions where different levee or wall sections joined together. This was not supported by later final studies.

"The Corps keeps saying the piles were 17 feet, but their own drawings show them to be 10 feet, Ivor van Heerden said. "This is the first time anyone has been able to get a firm fix on what's really down there. And, so far, it's just 10 feet. Not nearly deep enough." The two sets of November tests conducted by the Corps of Engineers and LSU researchers used non-invasive seismic methods. Both studies understated the length of the piles by about seven feet. By December, seven of the actual piles had been pulled from the ground and measured. The Engineering News Record reported on December 16 that they ranged from 23' 3 1/8" to 23' 7 7/16" long, well within the original design specifications, contradicting the early report of short pilings.

They also found that homeowners along the 17th Street Canal, near the site of the breach, had been reporting their front yards flooding from persistent seepage from the canal for a year prior to Hurricane Katrina to the Sewerage and Water Board of New Orleans. However, no data exists confirming that the water was coming from the canal.

Other studies showed the levee floodwalls on the 17th Street Canal were "destined to fail" from bad Corps of Engineers design, saying in part, "that miscalculation was so obvious and fundamental," investigators said, they, "could not fathom how the design team of engineers from the Corps, local firm Eustis Engineering, and the national firm Modjeski and Masters could have missed what is being termed the costliest engineering mistake in American history."

Dr. Robert Bea, chair of an independent levee investigation team, has said that the New Orleans-based design firm Modjeski and Masters could have followed correct procedures in calculating safety factors for the flood walls. He added, however, that design procedures of the Corps may not account for changes in soil strength caused by the changes in water flow and pressure during a hurricane flood. Dr. Bea has also questioned the size of the design safety margins. He said the corps applied a 30% margin over the maximum design load. A doubling of strength would be a more typical margin for highway bridges, dams, off-shore oil platforms and other public structures. There were also indications that substandard concrete may have been used at the 17th Street Canal.

In August 2007, the Corps released an analysis revealing that their floodwalls were so poorly designed that the maximum safe load is only  of water, which is half the original  design.

A report released in August 2015 in the official journal of the World Water Council concluded the following:

Overtopping of levees in the Eastern New Orleans
According to Professor Raymond Seed of the University of California, Berkeley, a surge of water estimated at 24 feet (7 m), about 10 feet (3 m) higher than the height of the levees along the city's eastern flank, swept into New Orleans from the Gulf of Mexico, causing most of the flooding in the city. He said that storm surge from Lake Borgne travelling up the Intracoastal Waterway caused the breaches on the Industrial Canal.

Aerial evaluation revealed damage to approximately 90% of some levee systems in the east which should have protected St. Bernard Parish.

National Academy of Sciences Investigation

On October 19, 2005, Defense Secretary Donald Rumsfeld announced that an independent panel of experts, under the direction of the National Academy of Sciences, would convene to evaluate the performance of the New Orleans levee system, and issue a final report in eight months. The panel would study the results provided by the two existing teams of experts that had already examined the levee failures. The academy concluded that “the engineering of the levee system was not adequate. The procedures for designing and constructing hurricane protection systems will have to be improved, and the designing organizations must upgrade their engineering capabilities. The levees must be seen not as a system to protect real estate but as a set of dams to protect people. There must be independent peer reviews of future designs and construction.”

Senate Committee hearings
Preliminary investigations and evidence were presented before the U.S. Senate Committee on Homeland Security and Governmental Affairs on November 2, 2005, and generally confirmed the findings of the preliminary investigations.

On November 9, 2005, The Government Accountability Office testified before the Senate Committee on Environment and Public Works.  The report cited the Flood Control Act of 1965, which authorized the U.S. Army Corps of Engineers to design and construct a flood protection system to protect south Louisiana from the strongest storms characteristic of the region.

Corps of Engineers admits problems with design
On April 5, 2006, months after independent investigators had demonstrated that the levee failures were not due to natural forces beyond intended design strength, Lt. Gen. Carl Strock testified before the U.S. Senate Subcommittee on Energy and Water that "the corps neglected to consider the possibility that floodwalls atop the 17th Street Canal levee would lurch away from their footings under significant water pressure and eat away at the earthen barriers below. We did not account for that occurring." Strock said it could be called a design failure. He also testified that the U.S. Army Corps of Engineers did not know of this mechanism of failure prior to August 29, 2005. The claim of ignorance is refuted by the National Science Foundation investigators hired by the Army Corps of Engineers, who point to a 1986 study (E-99 study) by the corps itself that such separations were possible in the I-wall design. Nearly two months later, on June 1, 2006, the USACE issued their first draft report which states that "the storm exceeded design criteria, but the performance was less than the design intent." The final report was issued June 2009.

The E-99 study is addressed again in a report released in August 2015 by J. David Rogers et al., who concluded that a misinterpretation of the 1986 study occurred apparently because the Corps had draped a tarpaulin over the gap that formed between the bases of the deflecting sheet piles and the soil in which they were embedded, so they did not see the gap. The tarpaulin was there for safety and to stop water that would seep through the interlocks. Failure to include the gap in interpretation of the test results introduced unconservatism in the final designs based on these tests. It allowed the use of shorter sheet piles, and reduced overall flood protection reliability.

Replacement levees 
Following the levee failures during Hurricane Katrina, the Bush administration ordered that the levee system be rebuilt by the US Army Corps of Engineers to protect the city from a 100-year storm. Gates and auxiliary pumps were added to the mouths of the three major drainage canals as well as the Inner Harbor Navigation Channel to prevent water from entering the heart of the city from Lake Pontchartrain. In addition, a surge barrier was built east of the city to prevent water from entering the city from the Gulf of Mexico. Ultimately, the system’s price tag rose to 14.5 billion dollars.

The strength of Hurricane Ida on August 29, 2021––exactly 16 years later––forced a considerable amount of water towards New Orleans and the system performed as designed. The surge heights and direction of the surge was different than in Hurricane Katrina and it is noted that the mayor of New Orleans did not order a mandatory evacuation. Nonetheless, realizing that there needed to be more updates and changes, the U.S. Army Corps of Engineers requested $3.2 billion from Congress in the fall 2021 to ensure that they could continue to provide 100-year level of hurricane protection through 2073.

Conspiracy theories

Nation of Islam leader Louis Farrakhan among other public figures claimed the levees were dynamited to divert waters away from wealthy white areas. The conspiracy theory reached a United States House of Representatives committee investigating Katrina when a New Orleans community activist made the claim. According to the New Orleans Times Picayune this is an "urban myth". Reasons for belief in these theories have been ascribed to the decision by city officials during the Great Mississippi Flood of 1927 to set off 30 tons of dynamite on the levee at Caernarvon, Louisiana which eased pressure on levees at New Orleans but flooded St. Bernard Parish, the Ninth Ward taking the brunt of the city's flooding during Hurricane Betsy, the general disenfranchisement of blacks and lower-class people, and the similarity of the sound of the levees collapsing to that of a bombing.

See also
Flood Control Act of 1965
17th Street Canal
Civil engineering and infrastructure repair in New Orleans after Hurricane Katrina
Drainage in New Orleans
Industrial Canal
ING 4727
Old River Control Structure
The New Orleans Levee (newspaper)
Seabrook Floodgate
London Avenue Canal
U.S. Army Corps of Engineers civil works controversies (New Orleans)

References

Further reading

Bush, Ann McReynolds, "Katrina: 10 Years On" (year 2015 publisher+Amazon
Horowitz, Andy. Katrina: A History, 1915–2015 (Harvard University Press, 2020), long-term scholarly perspective.
Rosenthal, Sandy, Words Whispered in Water: Why the Levees Broke in Hurricane Katrina (Mango, 2020), non-fiction account of author’s battle to expose Army Corps of Engineers

External links
Levees.Org (non-profit flood protection group in New Orleans)
 Interagency Performance Evaluation Taskforce (IPET) Draft Final Report (1 June 2006) provided by USACE Note: Site may be slow to load and considered non-secure by IE7
 IPET Draft Final Report (1 June 2006) provided by The Times-Picayune
 Independent Levee Investigation Team (ILIT) Final Report (31 July 2006)
*
ASCE Hurricane Katrina External Review Panel Report (2007). at web.archive.org
 Decision-Making Chronology for Hurricane Protection Project

George W. Bush administration controversies
Dikes in the United States